Fabrice Mbvouvouma (born 21 July 1997) is a Cameroonian professional footballer who most recently played as a midfielder for FC Montreal in the United Soccer League.

Career
Born in Mbalmayo, Cameroon, Mbvouvouma started his career with Rainbow Football Club in Cameroon before signing with Canadian soccer side, FC Montreal, on 28 August 2015. He made his professional debut for the side on 5 September 2015 against Toronto FC II. He came on as a 63rd-minute substitute as FC Montreal lost 3–2.

International
Mbvouvouma has represented Cameroon at the under-17 and under-20 levels.

Career statistics

References

External links 
 US Soccer Profile.

1997 births
Living people
Cameroonian footballers
Association football midfielders
Rainbow FC (Cameroon) players
FC Montreal players
USL Championship players
Expatriate soccer players in Canada